BHS–PL Beton Bornholm is a Danish UCI Continental team founded in 2015.

Team roster

Major wins
2016
Profronde van Noord-Holland, Mathias Westergaard
 Time Trial Championships, Martin Toft Madsen
2017
Skive-Løbet, Martin Toft Madsen
 Time Trial Championships, Martin Toft Madsen
2018
Classic Loire Atlantique, Rasmus Quaade
Hafjell GP, Martin Toft Madsen
Chrono Champenois Masculin International, Martin Toft Madsen
Duo Normand, Martin Toft Madsen & Rasmus Quaade
Chrono des Nations, Martin Toft Madsen
2019
Stage 2 (ITT) Danmark Rundt, Martin Toft Madsen
2022
 Stage 4 International Tour of Hellas, Nils Broge

National champions
2016
 Denmark Time Trial, Martin Toft Madsen
2017
 Denmark Time Trial, Martin Toft Madsen
2018
 Denmark Time Trial, Martin Toft Madsen

References

External links

UCI Continental Teams (Europe)
Cycling teams based in Denmark
Cycling teams established in 2015
2015 establishments in Denmark